See Without Looking is a 2013 fictional Chinese language TV serial broadcast by CCTV-1 in 2013 with collections sold on DVD that incorporates blind masseurs (a common occupation for blind people in China) in the plot. 30 episodes were broadcast, each around 40 to 45 minutes in length.

References

2010s Chinese television series
Television shows set in Nanjing
Television shows based on Chinese novels
Chinese drama television series